Disclosure is a 2020 Australian film written and directed by Michael Bentham; it is his directorial debut and premiered at the Palm Springs Film Festival in January 2020. It is a story about how two sets of parents deal with allegations of child-on-child sexual assault (a four-year-old girl accusing a nine-year-old boy).

At the 11th AACTA Awards the film was nominated Best Indie Film. In 2021 the film was also nominated for an Australian Directors' Guild Award (Best Direction in a Feature Film), and won the 2021 ATOM Award for Best Fiction Feature Film.

Cast
 Geraldine Hakewill as Bek Chalmers
 Mark Leonard Winter as Danny Bowman
 Matilda Ridgway as Emily Bowman
 Tom Wren as Joel Chalmers
 Greg Stone as Steve

Production 
Production was completed in 2018 on a shoestring budget without support from the Australian government, with director Michael Bentham describing it as a "micro-budget ensemble drama". Film Daze's Joshua Sorensen stated, "a cursory amount of research indicates that it is unlikely to be higher than a few thousand dollars".

It was shot in the Dandenong Ranges in Victoria, and its first theatrical release was at the Cameo Theatre in Belgrave, close to where filming took place. Its streaming release date in North America was 26 June 2020, and 15 September 2021 in Australia.

Reception

Disclosure received positive reviews from film critics when it screened at Palm Springs International Film Festival. Alex Saveliev of Film Threat gave the film four stars, calling Disclosure "a unique, highly relevant gem" that "marks the arrival of a talent to watch." Variety's Dennis Harvey described Disclosure as "a little firecracker", while Brad Shreiber included Disclosure in his 'Best of 2020 Palm Springs Festival', describing the film as "disturbing in the best possible way."

All 40 external reviews listed on IMDb.com have been favourable.

After the film's theatrical release in Australia, Jim Schembri called Disclosure "a blistering, confronting, independently made, issue-driven storm of raw, often excoriating verbal exchanges seething with passion, anger and hot-button topicality." David Stratton stated that "the explosive themes are handled with a forthright candour" in The Australian, while Dave Griffiths gave the film five stars in Heavy magazine, stating that "Disclosure reveals one of the best Australian filmmakers we have seen in years." Disclosure was included in NME's list of 'The 10 Best Australian Films of 2021'.

References

External links
 
 

2020 films
Films about sex crimes
Films shot in Victoria (Australia)
Australian drama films
2020 directorial debut films
2020s English-language films